William Martin Curran (born December 30, 1959) is a former American football wide receiver who played in the National Football League for three seasons. He played college football at UCLA.

Professional career
Willie signed with the Atlanta Falcons as an undrafted free agent following the 1982 NFL Draft. He saw action in 37 games over three seasons, mostly on special teams. In the 1984 season, Curran returned kicks and punts.

Post-playing career
In 2012, Curran was one of over 4,000 former football players to join a class-action lawsuit against the NFL over concussion-related brain injuries. In the lawsuit, Curran claimed that chronic head trauma suffered during his playing career has left him with a number of cognitive issues and health problems.

Since leaving Professional Football, William M Curran IV has a continuing career in the financial services industry for over 39 yrs.  The last 10 years as a Private Banker.

Personal life
Curran lives with his wife Heather in Windsor, California.
Now lives in New Braunfels, TX.

References

External links
 Pro Football Archives bio

1959 births
Living people
Players of American football from Inglewood, California
American football wide receivers
UCLA Bruins football players
Atlanta Falcons players
People from Windsor, California